Rooks County Regional Airport  is in Rooks County, Kansas. Owned by the Rooks County Airport Commission, it is six miles south of Stockton, Kansas and seven miles north of Plainville, Kansas.

Most U.S. airports use the same three-letter location identifier for the FAA and IATA, but this airport is RCP to the FAA and has no IATA code. (Cinder River, Alaska has IATA code RCP.)

Facilities
The airport covers 459 acres (186 ha) at an elevation of 1,998 feet (609 m). Its one runway, 18/36, is 5,000 by 75 feet (1,524 x 23 m) concrete.

References

External links 
 Rooks County Regional Airport (RCP) at Rooks County website
 

Airports in Kansas
Buildings and structures in Rooks County, Kansas
Transportation in Rooks County, Kansas